Timeless (stylized as Timel3ss) was the sixth concert tour by French recording artist, Mylène Farmer. The tour supported the singer's ninth studio album, Monkey Me (2012). The tour began on 7 September 2013 and ended on 3 December 2013. It played 39 shows in five countries, performing for over 500,000 people.

Setlist
The following setlist was obtained from the concert held on 7 September 2013; at the Palais omnisports de Paris-Bercy in Paris, France. It does not represent all concerts for the duration of the tour.
"Video Sequence"
"À force de..."
"Comme j'ai mal"
"C'est une belle journée"
"Monkey Me"
"Slipping Away (Crier la vie)" 
"Elle a dit" 
"Oui mais... non"
"Dance Sequence" 
"Mad World" 
"Les mots" 
"Je te dis tout"
"Et pourtant..."
"Désenchantée"
"Bleu Noir"
"Diabolique mon ange"
"Sans contrefaçon"
"Maman a tort"
"Je t'aime mélancolie"
"XXL" 
"À l'ombre"
Encore
 "Inséparables"
"Rêver"

Tour dates

Broadcasts and recordings
The concerts in Lyon were recorded for a concert film and live album. The live album, Timeless 2013 was released on December 9, 2013. The concert film, Timeless 2013: Le Film was screened in more than one hundred cinemas across France, Belgium and Switzerland on 27 March 2014.

References

2013 concert tours
Mylène Farmer concert tours